Nathan John Porritt (born 9 January 1990) is a former English footballer. He started his career with his hometown club Middlesbrough where he attracted interest from Chelsea despite never featuring for the first-team.

Early life
Porritt was born in Middlesbrough, North Yorkshire. At the age of ten, he joined Middlesbrough F.C.'s youth academy while continuing his education at The King's Academy.

Club career

Middlesbrough
Secret filming for BBC Panorama's programme "Undercover: Football's Dirty Secrets", aired in September 2006, exposed an agent acting without Middlesbrough's permission in offering the then 15-year-old Porritt to club representatives, including Chelsea's youth director Frank Arnesen, in contravention of the Football Association's rules.

Porritt signed a two-year scholarship with Middlesbrough in the summer of 2006, and signed his first professional contract with the club on 10 June 2008. Porritt's contract with Middlesbrough was cancelled by mutual consent on 1 February 2010.

Porritt was reported to have trained with Portuguese clubs Belenenses, and Olhanense but did not sign for them.
After a frustrating six-month spell at financially troubled Belgian Third Division club Olympic Charleroi Porritt was released from his contract with the club. Porritt has since had trials with West Ham United, Blackpool and Hartlepool.  On 23 February 2013 he signed for Billingham Synthonia.

From 2017 until 2020, he was the kitman at Hartlepool United.

International career
Considered a bright prospect, he was a member of the England under-17 squad at the 2007 FIFA U-17 World Cup. He was called up to the England under-18 squad in 2008. He had also played a number of games for the U16 team, previous to this.

References

External links

 

1990 births
Living people
Footballers from Middlesbrough
English footballers
England youth international footballers
Association football forwards
Middlesbrough F.C. players
Darlington F.C. players
R. Olympic Charleroi Châtelet Farciennes players
Stokesley Sports Club F.C. players
Billingham Synthonia F.C. players
English Football League players
Hartlepool United F.C. non-playing staff